is a town located on Nakanoshima, in Oki District, Shimane Prefecture, Japan.

As of March 2017, the town had an estimated population of 2,293 and a population density of 68 persons per km².

History
Ama was part of the ancient Oki Province, and the island consisted of a single district, also called Ama, and three villages. Emperor Go-Toba, defeated in the Jōkyū War in 1221, was exiled to the Oki Islands, and lived in Ama for 19 years until his death in 1239. Oki Shrine was built in 1939 to commemorate the 700th year of his death.

Geography
Ama occupies all of the island of Nakanoshima, in the Oki Islands archipelago in the Sea of Japan, along with a number of offshore uninhabited islands and rocks. Much of the island is within the borders of Daisen-Oki National Park.

Climate
Ama has a humid subtropical climate (Köppen climate classification Cfa) with very warm summers and cool winters. Precipitation is abundant throughout the year.

Demographics

Ama came under the control of the Matsue Domain in the Edo period, and was divided into seven villages. After the Meiji restoration, the Oki Islands became part of Tottori Prefecture in 1871, but were transferred to Shimane Prefecture in 1881. Ama Village was established in 1904. Its population peaked in 1950 with 6,986 inhabitants, and has declined ever since. It was raised to town status on January 1, 1969.

Economy
The town economy is primarily based on agriculture and commercial fishing.

Notable people from Ama
 Misako Tanaka – actress

References

External links
 
  

Towns in Shimane Prefecture
Populated coastal places in Japan